Storm chaser or stormchaser may refer to:

Weather
Storm chasing, the pursuit of any severe weather condition
Storm chaser, colloquial term referring to scammers who enter areas recently afflicted by disasters offering false or shoddy services
Storm Chaser, a book by Warren Faidley, professional storm chasing journalist    
Storm Chasers (TV series), a documentary reality television series on the Discovery Channel

Entertainment
Storm Chaser (EP), a 2007 EP by Erasure
Storm Chaser (roller coaster), a 2016 roller coaster at the Kentucky Kingdom amusement park
Omaha Storm Chasers, an American baseball team
Stormchaser (novel), a 1999 children's novel by Paul Stewart and Chris Riddell
Stormchaser (album), a 2008 album by Light This City
StoRMChaser, a Danish jazz musical group